Max Zhang may refer to:

 Zhang Jin (born 1974), Chinese actor
 Zhang Zhaoxu (born 1987), Chinese basketball player